In linear algebra, a QR decomposition, also known as a QR factorization or QU factorization, is a decomposition of a matrix A into a product A = QR of an orthogonal matrix Q and an upper triangular matrix R. QR decomposition is often used to solve the linear least squares problem and is the basis for a particular eigenvalue algorithm, the QR algorithm.

Cases and definitions

Square matrix
Any real square matrix A may be decomposed as
 

where Q is an orthogonal matrix (its columns are orthogonal unit vectors meaning  and R is an upper triangular matrix (also called right triangular matrix). If A is invertible, then the factorization is unique if we require the diagonal elements of R to be positive.

If instead A is a complex square matrix, then there is a decomposition A = QR where Q is a unitary matrix (so 

If A has n linearly independent columns, then the first n columns of Q form an orthonormal basis for the column space of A. More generally, the first k columns of Q form an orthonormal basis for the span of the first k columns of A for any .  The fact that any column k of A only depends on the first k columns of Q corresponds to the triangular form of R.

Rectangular matrix

 call Q1R1 the thin QR factorization of A; Trefethen and Bau call this the reduced QR factorization. If A is of full rank n and we require that the diagonal elements of R1 are positive then R1 and Q1 are unique, but in general Q2 is not. R1 is then equal to the upper triangular factor of the Cholesky decomposition of A A (= ATA if A is real).

QL, RQ and LQ decompositions
Analogously, we can define QL, RQ, and LQ decompositions, with L being a lower triangular matrix.

Computing the QR decomposition
There are several methods for actually computing the QR decomposition, such as by means of the Gram–Schmidt process, Householder transformations, or Givens rotations. Each has a number of advantages and disadvantages.

Using the Gram–Schmidt process

Define the projection:

then:

We can now express the s over our newly computed orthonormal basis:

where  This can be written in matrix form:

where:

and

Example
Consider the decomposition of
 

Recall that an orthonormal matrix  has the property 

Then, we can calculate  by means of Gram–Schmidt as follows:
 

Thus, we have

Relation to RQ decomposition
The RQ decomposition transforms a matrix A into the product of an upper triangular matrix R (also known as right-triangular) and an orthogonal matrix Q. The only difference from QR decomposition is the order of these matrices.

QR decomposition is Gram–Schmidt orthogonalization of columns of A, started from the first column.

RQ decomposition is Gram–Schmidt orthogonalization of rows of A, started from the last row.

Advantages and disadvantages

The Gram-Schmidt process is inherently numerically unstable. While the application of the projections has an appealing geometric analogy to orthogonalization, the orthogonalization itself is prone to numerical error. A significant advantage is the ease of implementation.

Using Householder reflections

A Householder reflection (or Householder transformation) is a transformation that takes a vector and reflects it about some plane or hyperplane.

Q can be used to reflect a vector in such a way that all coordinates but one disappear.

Let  be an arbitrary real m-dimensional column vector of  such that  for a scalar α. If the algorithm is implemented using floating-point arithmetic, then α should get the opposite sign as the k-th coordinate of  where  is to be the pivot coordinate after which all entries are 0 in matrix As final upper triangular form, to avoid loss of significance. In the complex case, set

and substitute transposition by conjugate transposition in the construction of Q below.

 

Or, if  is complex
 

 is an m-by-m Householder matrix, which is both symmetric and orthogonal (Hermitian and unitary in the complex case), and
 

This can be used to gradually transform an m-by-n matrix A to upper triangular form. First, we multiply A with the Householder matrix Q1 we obtain when we choose the first matrix column for x. This results in a matrix Q1A with zeros in the left column (except for the first row).
 

This can be repeated for A′ (obtained from Q1A by deleting the first row and first column), resulting in a Householder matrix Q′2. Note that Q′2 is smaller than Q1. Since we want it really to operate on Q1A instead of A′ we need to expand it to the upper left, filling in a 1, or in general:

After  iterations of this process, 

is an upper triangular matrix. So, with

This method has greater numerical stability than the Gram–Schmidt method above.

The following table gives the number of operations in the k-th step of the QR-decomposition by the Householder transformation, assuming a square matrix with size n.

Summing these numbers over the  steps (for a square matrix of size n), the complexity of the algorithm (in terms of floating point multiplications) is given by

Example
Let us calculate the decomposition of
 

First, we need to find a reflection that transforms the first column of matrix A, vector  into 

Now,
 

and
 

Here,
  and 

Therefore
 

Now observe:

so we already have almost a triangular matrix. We only need to zero the (3, 2) entry.

Take the (1, 1) minor, and then apply the process again to

By the same method as above, we obtain the matrix of the Householder transformation

after performing a direct sum with 1 to make sure the next step in the process works properly.

Now, we find

Or, to four decimal digits,

The matrix Q is orthogonal and R is upper triangular, so  is the required QR decomposition.

Advantages and disadvantages

The use of Householder transformations is inherently the most simple of the numerically stable QR decomposition algorithms due to the use of reflections as the mechanism for producing zeroes in the R matrix. However, the Householder reflection algorithm is bandwidth heavy and not parallelizable, as every reflection that produces a new zero element changes the entirety of both Q and R matrices.

Using Givens rotations
QR decompositions can also be computed with a series of Givens rotations. Each rotation zeroes an element in the subdiagonal of the matrix, forming the R matrix.  The concatenation of all the Givens rotations forms the orthogonal Q matrix.

In practice, Givens rotations are not actually performed by building a whole matrix and doing a matrix multiplication.  A Givens rotation procedure is used instead which does the equivalent of the sparse Givens matrix multiplication, without the extra work of handling the sparse elements. The Givens rotation procedure is useful in situations where only relatively few off-diagonal elements need to be zeroed, and is more easily parallelized than Householder transformations.

Example
Let us calculate the decomposition of
 

First, we need to form a rotation matrix that will zero the lowermost left element,   We form this matrix using the Givens rotation method, and call the matrix .  We will first rotate the vector  to point along the X axis.  This vector has an angle   We create the orthogonal Givens rotation matrix, :

And the result of  now has a zero in the  element.

Advantages and disadvantages

The QR decomposition via Givens rotations is the most involved to implement, as the ordering of the rows required to fully exploit the algorithm is not trivial to determine. However, it has a significant advantage in that each new zero element  affects only the row with the element to be zeroed (i) and a row above (j). This makes the Givens rotation algorithm more bandwidth efficient and parallelizable than the Householder reflection technique.

Connection to a determinant or a product of eigenvalues
We can use QR decomposition to find the determinant of a square matrix. Then we have

 can be chosen such that . Thus,

Furthermore, because the determinant equals the product of the eigenvalues, we have

We can extend the above properties to a non-square complex matrix  by introducing the definition of QR decomposition for non-square complex matrices and replacing eigenvalues with singular values.

Start with a QR decomposition for a non-square matrix A:
 

From the properties of the SVD and the determinant of a matrix, we have

However, if A is square, then

It follows that the QR decomposition can be used to efficiently calculate the product of the eigenvalues or singular values of a matrix.

Column pivoting
Pivoted QR differs from ordinary Gram-Schmidt in that it takes the largest remaining column at the beginning of each new step—column pivoting— and thus introduces a permutation matrix P:

Column pivoting is useful when A is (nearly) rank deficient, or is suspected of being so. It can also improve numerical accuracy. P is usually chosen so that the diagonal elements of R are non-increasing: . This can be used to find the (numerical) rank of A at lower computational cost than a singular value decomposition, forming the basis of so-called rank-revealing QR algorithms.

Using for solution to linear inverse problems
Compared to the direct matrix inverse, inverse solutions using QR decomposition are more numerically stable as evidenced by their reduced condition numbers [Parker, Geophysical Inverse Theory, Ch1.13].

To solve the underdetermined  linear problem  where the matrix  has dimensions  and rank  first find the QR factorization of the transpose of   where Q is an orthogonal matrix (i.e.  and R has a special form: . Here  is a square  right triangular matrix, and the zero matrix has dimension  After some algebra, it can be shown that a solution to the inverse problem can be expressed as:  where one may either find  by Gaussian elimination or compute  directly by forward substitution. The latter technique enjoys greater numerical accuracy and lower computations.

To find a solution  to the overdetermined  problem  which minimizes the norm  first find the QR factorization of   The solution can then be expressed as  where  is an  matrix containing the first  columns of the full orthonormal basis  and where  is as before.

Generalizations
Iwasawa decomposition generalizes QR decomposition to semi-simple Lie groups.

See also
 Polar decomposition
 Eigenvalue decomposition
 Spectral decomposition
 LU decomposition
 Singular value decomposition

References

Further reading
 .

External links
Online Matrix Calculator Performs QR decomposition of matrices.
LAPACK users manual gives details of subroutines to calculate the QR decomposition
Mathematica users manual gives details and examples of routines to calculate QR decomposition
ALGLIB includes a partial port of the LAPACK to C++, C#, Delphi, etc.
Eigen::QR Includes C++ implementation of QR decomposition.

Matrix decompositions
Numerical linear algebra